Prep & Landing: Naughty vs. Nice is a 2011 computer animated 3-D television special, produced by Walt Disney Animation Studios, and directed by Kevin Deters and Stevie Wermers-Skelton. It aired on December 5, 2011, on the ABC TV channel. The special is the second and final half-hour Christmas special, and the fourth and final short film in the Prep & Landing series, after Prep & Landing, Tiny's BIG Adventure, and Operation: Secret Santa.

Plot 
The beginning of the special introduces the Coal Elf Brigade, a special unit of Christmas elves resembling coal miners that is responsible for delivering lumps of coal to naughty children. While seeming cruel to some, the brigade adds small, encouraging notes to the lumps such as "Try Harder next year," in an attempt to steer the children back to the nice list.

With the Big 2-5 fast approaching, Wayne and Lanny must race to recover classified North Pole technology that has fallen into the hands of a hacker identified only as "jinglesmell1337." Desperate to prevent Christmas from descending into chaos, Wayne seeks out (at the insistence of Magee) the foremost Naughty Kid expert to aid in the mission, a bombastic member of the Coal Elf Brigade who also happens to be his estranged younger (but larger) brother, Noel. Reluctant to take the extroverted Noel along with him, Wayne relents, and Noel joins the Prep & Landing team on the mission. During the trip, Noel and Wayne reminisce about their childhood, when they worked together far better than they do now. As the trio arrives at the hacker's house, Wayne sets off a booby trap, imperiling the entire team; Noel manages to defend himself, Wayne takes a particular beating from the trap's various mechanisms, and Lanny makes it into the hacker's room, only to accidentally "sparkle" himself and end up taken captive.

The hacker then reveals herself to be Grace Goodwin, whose sole mission is to get herself off the naughty list, believing that she had been set up by her toddler brother, Gabriel, who had destroyed her favorite toy and ruined her chances to ask Santa for a new one by his crying. After a somewhat intoxicated Lanny suggests using the "magic word" to get the password for the device that will get her off the list, she does just that: using the word "please" as the password, since genuinely naughty kids never say "please." At first, she appears successful in changing her status from naughty to nice, but the device malfunctions, threatening to place the entire planet on the naughty list unless she and the team can pull off a risky operation to fix the problem.

Meanwhile, Wayne is particularly bitter at being "shown up" by his younger brother, prompting a fight in the street in front of Grace's house in which Wayne goes as far to say that he wish that he never had a brother. Shocked and hurt by his statement, Noel (who always idolized Wayne growing up) asks Wayne to say he didn't mean it. Noel says that he looked up to him and that he was his hero before threatening to throw what he had intended to give Wayne as a Christmas present at him. The gift—a toy sled that Wayne had wanted as a kid but was never able to get—prompts Wayne to reconcile with Noel and carry out the mission. Grace, watching the whole argument as it unfolds, learns a powerful lesson and a newfound appreciation for her younger brother.

Wayne then receives a call from Magee who tells him that the device is causing bigger problems making every single child is being transferred to the naughty list. Wayne tells them that the antenna on Conduct Calculator is broken and so Mr. Thistleton tells him to fix it and attach it to a powerful antenna to reverse the damage. Grace realizes that this is all her fault and Noel asks how they're going to find an antenna until Lanny (who had come outside too) finds a nearby building with a strong antenna. Grace helps fix the Conduct Calculator as they make their way to the building. Once fixed, she tosses the calculator to Wayne and apologizes for being naughty. As Noel and Wayne climb up the building, all the presents are getting sucked up into the tube as tree farm progresses on transferring every child onto the naughty list. Once Wayne and Noel reach the top, they realized that they can't go near the antenna due to electric hazard. Wayne decides to tie the super sled to the device but Noel couldn't get a good shot due to the flags getting blown in the wind. So Wayne decided to jump off the building with Noel before activating the parachute on his hat to fly up higher so Noel can get a clear shot at the antenna. He fires the grapple and lets go of it as it pulls him forward and sticks to the antenna with the calculator, causing the satellite to go back to normal as all kids get transferred back to the nice list again, All presents get dropped back into Santa's sack saving Christmas once and for all.

The next morning, the scene at the Goodwin house shows Gabriel giving Grace her new Christmas present; a replacement toy for the one he had destroyed a year prior. Meanwhile, back at the North Pole, Wayne and Noel both win the title of "Elves of the Year" for their efforts and cooperation (although the headline of the local paper misprints Wayne's name as "Dwayne").

Cast 
 Dave Foley as Wayne
 Derek Richardson as Lanny
 Sarah Chalke as Magee
 Rob Riggle as Noel
 Chris Parnell as Mr. Thistleton
 W. Morgan Sheppard as 'The Big Guy' Santa Claus
 Emily Alyn Lind as Grace Goodwin
 Hayes MacArthur as Thrasher
 Phil LaMarr as Crumbles
 Christopher Harrison as Gene the Salesman
 Grace Potter as Carol
 Kevin Deters as Hop With Me Bunny

Release 
The special was released on DVD and Blu-ray of Prep & Landing: Totally Tinsel Collection on November 6, 2012, together with Prep & Landing, Operation: Secret Santa, and Tiny's BIG Adventure. The 3D version of the special is being screened at the Muppet*Vision 3D theatre at Disney California Adventure in Anaheim, CA.

Awards 
On December 5, 2011, on the day of its first broadcast, Prep & Landing: Naughty vs. Nice was nominated for eleven Annie Awards in seven categories by the International Animated Film Association, ASIFA-Hollywood. It won four awards, one for character animation, character design, music and storyboarding.

References

External links 

 
 

American Christmas films
2011 computer-animated films
2011 films
2011 television films
Films scored by Michael Giacchino
Christmas television specials
2010s Christmas films
2010s Disney animated short films
2011 3D films
2010s English-language films
Films directed by Kevin Deters